Carols in the City (also known as IGA Lord Mayor's Carols in the City), is an annual free Christmas concert event held at Riverstage in Brisbane, Australia. It is currently held on the second Saturday in December. The event is broadcast on the Nine Network across Queensland.

History

The event was broadcast on the Nine Network from the 1970s until 2010. It was then on Network Ten for 2011 until 2013, returning to Nine in 2014. For a time it was a major supporter of the Royal Flying Doctor Service of Australia. It was also run by the City Tabernacle Baptist Church.

Past and current performers
The concert features many established, as well as up and coming talent.
Jack Vidgen
Guy Sebastian
Stan Walker
Marina Prior
Troy Cassar-Daley
Paulini
Dean Geyer
Julie Anthony
The Idea of North
James Morrison
Emma Pask
Colin Buchanan
Karen Knowles
Jason Barry-Smith
Harvest Rain Theatre Company
Wurrawhy
Lauren Porter
Justice Crew

Sponsors
IGA
Brisbane City Council
RACQ
Village Roadshow Theme Parks and Attractions
Myer
World Vision Australia
Smart Business Services
Lyndons
Churches of Christ in Australia
Hammered Silver Recording Studios
Brisbane Concert Lighting
CPC production Services
Deep Blue Events
City Tabernacle Baptist Church
North Coast Joinery

Charity partner
Royal Flying Doctor Service of Australia

Media partners
The Sunday Mail
4BC
4BH
Nine Network

References

External links
 Lord Mayor's Christmas Carols

Festivals in Brisbane
Christmas festivals
Annual events in Brisbane
Nine Network specials
Network 10 specials